Riccardo Bacchelli (19 April 1891 – 8 October 1985) was an Italian writer. In 1927 he was one of the founders of the review La Ronda and Bagutta Prize for literature. He was nominated for the Nobel Prize in Literature eight times.

Career
His first novel was Il filo meraviglioso di Lodovico Clo (The wonderful thread of Lodovico Clo). Next was Lo sa il tonno (1923). Other works include Il Diavolo al Pontelungo (1927) and La città degli amanti (The City of Lovers, 1929).

His most popular work remains Il mulino del Po (The Mill on the Po) (1938–1940), which covered a century in the life of a rural family. A film adapted from the novel was released in 1949. Later novels, published from 1945 to 1978, include: Il pianto del figlio di Lais, Non ti chiamerò più padre, La cometa, Il rapporto segreto (The secret relationship), Afrodite: un romanzo d'amore (Aphrodite: a love novel), Il progresso è un razzo (Progress is a rocket) and Il sommergibile (The submarine).

Riccardo Bacchelli was elected as a member of the Royal Academy of Italy. He was awarded the Knight Grand Cross of the Order of Merit of the Italian Republic in 1971.

Il mulino del Po

The novel narrates in more than 2000 pages the lives, adventures and problems of Lazzaro Scacerni and his family. It opens in the early 19th century as Scacerni returns to Italy from Russia, where he had served as a soldier of Napoleon's invasion, and follows him and his family through a full century until the First World War. Scacerni owns a mill in a rural area on the river Po (hence the title). He and his descendants conduct their lives amid political turmoil, wars, economic hardship, and class conflicts.

The historical, geographical and social background was painstakingly researched by Bacchelli, who created a large and comprehensive portrait of life in rural Italy in the 19th century. The language and style of this novel show that Bacchelli held Alessandro Manzoni as his model. At the same time, he created a structure that showed his attention to contemporary European novels.

Honour 
 : Knight Grand Cross of the Order of Merit of the Italian Republic (19 April 1971)

References

External links

 
 http://www.maat.it/livello2/fascismo-manifesto.htm
 http://www.riccardobacchelli.it/

1891 births
1985 deaths
Writers from Bologna
20th-century Italian novelists
20th-century Italian male writers
Viareggio Prize winners
Members of the Royal Academy of Italy
Knights Grand Cross of the Order of Merit of the Italian Republic